Genoplesium sigmoideum, commonly known as the Dave's Creek midge orchid, is a species of small terrestrial orchid that is endemic to a small area in the Lamington National Park in Queensland. It has a single thin leaf fused to the flowering stem and up to twenty dark red flowers with a hairy labellum. The species is treated as Corunastylis sigmoidea in Queensland.

Description
The flowers are inverted so that the labellum is above the column rather than below it. There is a thick, tapering, dark purplish-red callus in the centre of the labellum and extending almost to its tip. Flowering occurs in December and January.

Taxonomy and naming
Genoplesium sigmoideum was first formally described in 1991 by David Jones and the description was published in Australian Orchid Research. In 2002, David Jones and Mark Clements changed the name to Corunastylis sigmoidea, the name the species is known by in Queensland, but the latter name is not accepted by the Australian Plant Census. The specific epithet (sigmoideum) refers to the S-shaped gland on the petals.

Distribution and habitat
Genoplesium sigmoideum grows with low shrubs in shallow soil on rock ledges near Dave's Creek in the Lamington National Park.

References

sigmoideum
Endemic orchids of Australia
Orchids of Queensland
Plants described in 1991